Abdullah bin Hamad bin Isa Al Khalifa (born 30 June 1975) is the second son of the present King of Bahrain, Hamad bin Isa Al Khalifah and his first wife, Sabika bint Ibrahim Al Khalifa.

Like all members of the royal family, Abdullah sits as a senior member of the civil judiciary.

In addition to his government positions, Abdullah is chairman of the Bahrain Motor Federation and the Commission Internationale de Karting. He is eighth in line to succeed his father as ruler of the Kingdom of Bahrain.

Friendship with Michael Jackson
A long-time friend of American pop legend Michael Jackson, Abdullah loaned Jackson $2.2million to pay legal fees after the singer was tried for child molestation in California in 2005. After a successful defense and the dismissal of all charges, Abdullah invited Jackson, his children, and his personal staff to stay in Bahrain; Jackson took him up on the invitation on 30June 2005.

As part of a plan to revive Jackson's career with the release of a new album, after Hurricane Katrina Sheikh Abdullah suggested that Jackson record a song Abdullah had written as a charity single at a recording studio in London, "I Have This Dream". Jackson undertook the recording session in London, but the single was never released through the co-owned record label 2Seas Group. Jackson left Bahrain in May 2006 for Ireland.

In November 2008, after trying to recover from Jackson £4.7million in costs that the singer had said were gifts, Abdullah sued the singer through the mutually agreed High Court in London. Abdullah claims that despite having paid the $2.2million (£1.5million) cost for Jackson to record a song intended to benefit the victims of Hurricane Katrina, the singer failed to show up at the studio for the final recording and the song was never released. Bankim ThankiQC, representing Abdullah, told the High Court that the day after Jackson's criminal trial ended in California, he recorded one of the songs that Abdullah had wanted released as a charity single to help victims of the Indian Ocean tsunami, and that Abdullah felt "a strong sense of personal betrayal" after forming "a close personal relationship" with the singer.

Marriage and children
Abdullah is married to Hessa bint Khalifa Al Khalifa, who from 2002 to 2004 was a member of the Supreme Council for Women, and has been a permanent member of the Board since 2004. Since 2006, she has been the executive director of Injaz Bahrain, a Member of Suzanne Mubarak Women's International Peace Movement, and a member of the Young Arab Leaders of Bahrain.

Together Abdullah and Hessa have four children, two sons and two daughters:
 Isa bin Abdullah bin Hamad Al Khalifa (born 1999), He is ninth in the line of succession to the Bahraini throne.
 Noora bint Abdullah bin Hamad Al Khalifa (born 2002)
 Salman bin Abdullah bin Hamad Al Khalifa (born 2008), He is tenth in the line of succession to the Bahraini throne.
Hessa bint Abdullah bin Hamad Al Khalifa (born 2010)

Ancestry

References

1976 births
Living people
Bahraini politicians
Abdullah Bin Hamad Bin Isa Al-Khalifa
Sons of kings